The 1983 Great Taste Discoverers season was the 9th season of the franchise in the Philippine Basketball Association (PBA). Return to Great Taste Coffee Makers beginning the Reinforced Filipino Conference.

Transactions

Summary
Three-time MVP Bogs Adornado and the former Houston Rockets draftee and naturalized filipino Ricardo Brown was signed by Great Taste (formerly N-Rich) in a pair of player deals. In their maiden appearance in the All-Filipino Conference, Adornado and Brown combined for identical outputs of 22 points each in helping Great Taste escape with a 93–92 opening day win over San Miguel Beer. The Discoverers finished second behind Crispa in the one-round eliminations. They were denied of a finals berth by Gilbey's and Crispa in the round-robin semifinals among four teams.

Last year's best import awardee Norman Black of San Miguel Beermen has moved to Great Taste in the second offing of the season. Black's entry and playing alongside Adornado and Brown has finally shed the Coffee Makers' image as a second division club and it has been a long time coming for Great Taste in their first entry to the finals after eight seasons. They beat Gilbey's Gin in the playoff for the right to faced Crispa Redmanizers in the Reinforced Filipino championship.

Going up against Crispa's prolific import Billy Ray Bates, the Coffee Makers led the best-of-five title series, two games to one and a win away from their first-ever PBA crown. The Redmanizers, however, battled back to win the last two games by big margins and take home their second championship of the season.

Norman Black teamed up with Charles Thompson in Great Taste' first two games in the Open Conference. Thompson had problems fitting into Great Taste' play patterns and was replaced by Dawan Scott. Great Taste makes it to the semifinals outright along with Crispa just like in the previous conference. In the semifinal round, the Coffee Makers were in danger of being booted out from the finals race going into their last two assignments, Great Taste had to beat Gilbey's and Crispa by a margin of three points to forge a four-way deadlock and two knockout games to determined the finalist.

On November 26, Great Taste defeated Gilbey's Gin and Crispa prevailed over San Miguel Beer in the second game to set-up a finals rematch for the Open Conference crown. The Crispa Redmanizers surprisingly had an easier time winning over the Coffee Makers this time, scoring a 3–0 sweep to win their second PBA Grandslam.

Occurrences
During the Open Conference, the Coffee Makers were on top of the standings when in their game against Galerie Dominique in the second round of eliminations, coach Jimmy Mariano was quote as saying "We didn't intend to win", which was carried out by the media and by his admission to deliberately lose the game, Mariano was sacked from his job. Former Crispa coach Baby Dalupan, who was hired as team consultant during the second conference, has taken over to replaced Mariano on the Great Taste bench starting the semifinal round.

Won-loss records vs Opponents

Awards
Ricardo Brown was named the season's Rookie of the Year (ROY).
William "Bogs" Adornado and Ricardo Brown made it to the Mythical Five selection.
Great Taste import Norman Black became the league's first recipient of the Award "Mr.100%".

Roster

 Team Manager: Ignacio Gotao

Additions

References

External links
Great Taste team photo

Great Taste Coffee Makers seasons
Great